Black Out (stylized in all caps) is the debut studio album of South Korean rapper Woo Won-jae. It was released on August 18, 2020, through AOMG.

Singles 
"Used to" was released on August 11, 2020.

Critical reception 

Lee Jin-seok of Rhythmer rated Black Out 3.5 out of 5 stars.

Lee Hong-hyeon of IZM also rated the album 3.5 out of 5 stars.

Accolades

Track listing

Charts

Sales

References 

2020 albums
Korean-language albums
Hip hop albums by South Korean artists
AOMG albums